Muhammad Shahril bin Mohamad Alias (born 14 May 1984) is a professional football player who plays for the Woodlands Wellington in the S.League.

He is a natural centre-back, though he can also play as a defensive midfielder or a right back.

Club career
Shahril has previously played for S.League clubs Woodlands Wellington, Young Lions, Home United and Hougang United FC.

In 2011, Shahril was transferred to Hougang United FC, replacing Fumiya Kobayashi at the centre back role. He made his debut for the Cheetahs against Gombak United on 30 June 2011 alongside Vitor Borges and was influential in Hougang's 3–2 win.

When his contract with Hougang expired at the end of the 2011 S.League season, he was transferred to Geylang United FC.

On 1 January 2013, it was announced that Shahril had joined Woodlands Wellington along with Ang Zhiwei after spending one season at Bedok Stadium, joining up with former Geylang United captain and goalkeeper, Yazid Yasin.

He made his debut for Woodlands Wellington on 21 February 2013 in a 2–2 draw against Warriors F.C.

His personal achievements include being a S.League runner-up with Home United in 2007, and a League Cup runner-up with Geylang United in 2012.

Club career statistics

Shahril Alias's Profile

All numbers encased in brackets signify substitute appearances.

Appearances in AFC Cup Competitions

International career
Shahril has 2 substitute appearances for Singapore in a 2010 World Cup Qualifier against Uzbekistan on 7 June 2008, and a friendly match against Poland on 23 January 2010.

International Appearances

References

External links

data2.7m.cn

Living people
Singaporean footballers
Home United FC players
1984 births
Singapore international footballers
Woodlands Wellington FC players
Hougang United FC players
Geylang International FC players
Singapore Premier League players
Young Lions FC players
Southeast Asian Games bronze medalists for Singapore
Southeast Asian Games medalists in football
Association football defenders
Competitors at the 2007 Southeast Asian Games
Association football midfielders